Yultimirovka (Yultimer) is a rural locality (a village) in Diyashevsky Selsoviet, Bakalinsky District, Bashkortostan, Russia. The population was 274 as of 2010. There are 2 streets.

Geography 
Yultimirovka is located 21 km southwest of Bakaly (the district's administrative centre) by road. Mikhaylovka is the nearest rural locality.

References 

Rural localities in Bakalinsky District